Steven David may refer to:

 Steven R. David, Professor of International Relations and Vice Dean for Undergraduate Education at Johns Hopkins University
 Steven H. David, formerly a Chief Defense Counsel at Guantanamo, currently a Justice of the Indiana Supreme Court
 Steve David, footballer

See also